Christmas Album is the sixth studio album by Boney M. It was recorded in the summer of 1981 and released on 23 November 1981. The album, which in certain territories was given the alternate title Christmas with Boney M..

The album includes the million-selling 1978 Christmas number one "Mary's Boy Child/Oh My Lord" and it yielded two further single releases, "Little Drummer Boy" in 1981, which became a Top 20 hit in Germany. A second single was released for Christmas 1982, "Zion's Daughter" (with new member Reggie Tsiboe pictured on the cover), failed to chart.

Track listing
Side A
"Little Drummer Boy" (Katherine K. Davis, Henry Onorati, Harry Simeone) – 4:21
"White Christmas"  (Irving Berlin) – 4:19
"Feliz Navidad"  (José Feliciano) – 3:07
"Jingle Bells" (James Lord Pierpont, Frank Farian) – 2:53
"Winter Fairy-Tale" (Instrumental) (Harald Baierl) – 2:58
"Mary's Boy Child - Oh My Lord" (Jester Hairston, Hela Lorin, Frank Farian, Fred Jay) – 5:10
Edited version

Side B
Christmas Medley: "Silent Night, Holy Night (Stille Nacht, Heilige Nacht)"/ "Snow Falls Over the Ground (Leise Rieselt Der Schnee)" / "Hear Ye the Message" (Franz Xaver Gruber, Joseph Mohr, Eduard Ebel, Frank Farian, Fred Jay) – 6:20
 The 2nd verse of "Silent Night" is sung in German on the German LP release but in English on the UK release. The full-length medley contained "Sweet Bells ("Süßer die Glocken nie klingen")" which wasn't released until 1986 when the medley was remixed and overdubbed.
"Petit Papa Noël" (Martinet, Vincy) – 1:41
"Zion's Daughter (Tochter Zion)"  (Traditional, George Frideric Handel, Frank Farian, Fred Jay, Helmut Rulofs) – 3:51
"When a Child Is Born" (Fred Jay, Zacar) – 3:20
"Darkness Is Falling" (Fred Jay, Helmut Rulofs) – 3:02
"I'll Be Home for Christmas" (Catherine Courage, Frank Farian, Helmut Rulofs) – 3:44

Personnel

Musicians
 Michael Drexler – lead vocals (track A1)
 Liz Mitchell – lead vocals (tracks A1-A4, A6, B1-B5)
 Marcia Barrett – backing vocals (tracks A3, A4 & A6)
 Frank Farian – lead vocals (track B6), backing vocals
 London Christmas Choir – choir
 Katie Kissoon – vocals, soprano
 Joy Yates – vocals, alto
 Helen Shappelle – vocals, soprano
 Simon Bell – vocals, tenor
 Nick Curtis – vocals, tenor
 George Chandler – vocals, baritone
 Russell Stone – vocals, bass
 Jerry Rix – additional vocals on track A1, bass
 Curt Cress – drums
 Dave King – bass guitar
 Günther Gebauer – bass guitar
 Mats Björklund – guitar
 Johan Daansen – guitar
 Harry Baierl – keyboards
 Kristian Schultze – keyboards
 London Philharmonic Orchestra – orchestra

Production
 Kurt Rieth – choir director
 Frank Farian – producer
 Helmut Rulofs – assistant producer
 Harry Baierl – musical arranger
 Stefan Klinkhammer – musical arranger
 Recorded at Abbey Road Studios and AIR Studios, London
 Steve Nye – sound engineer
 Recorded at Vigilant Studio, Nice
 Didier Utard – engineer
 Recorded at Union Studio, Munich
 Jochen Scheffer – engineer
 Recorded at Rainbow studio, Munich
 Volker Armand – engineer
 Mixed at Farian Studio
 Ariola-Eurodisc Studios – design
 Claus Lange – photography

Charts

Certifications and sales

Reissued
 1991: CD,	Hansa, 786723 
 2007: Christmas With Boney M., CD, Sony BMG Music Entertainment, 88697 14032 2
 2017: Boney M. Complete, 9 LP, Sony Music, 88985406971

References

External links
 Rate Your Music, detailed discography
 Discogs.com, detailed discography
 [ AllMusic, biography, discography etc.]

Boney M. albums
1981 Christmas albums
Albums produced by Frank Farian
Atlantic Records albums
Christmas albums by German artists
Hansa Records albums
Contemporary R&B Christmas albums
Eurodisco albums